Road 37 is a road that connects Takestan to Khuzestan. Part of it is a part of Ahvaz-Tehran Highway.

References

External links 

 Iran road map on Young Journalists Club

Roads in Iran